Kategoria e Dytë is the third professional level of football in Albania. It was called the Second Division until 2003. Kategoria e Dytë has two groups, A and B. which are divided geographically. It is made up of 23 teams. The winners of each group earn the right to be promoted to the Kategoria e Parë and they also play a single final for seasonal champions. Teams which finish in the last 2 positions on each group are relegated to the Kategoria e Tretë.

Clubs (2022–23)

Group A

Group B

Champions

See also
 List of football clubs in Albania

References

3
Third level football leagues in Europe
Kategoria e Dytë